Volemys is a small genus of rodents in the family Cricetidae. It contains the following species, both of which are endemic to China:
 Szechuan vole (Volemys millicens)
 Marie's vole (Volemys musseri)

References

 
Rodent genera
Taxonomy articles created by Polbot
Endemic fauna of China
Rodents of China